Sandra Campbell may refer to:

Sandra Campbell (beauty contestant), Miss Dominion of Canada
Sandra Campbell, project co-ordinator on Mario (album) and The Light of the Sun
Sandra Campbell (writer), see 1938 and 1971 in poetry

See also
Sandy Campbell (disambiguation)